Ashwini Deshpande is an Indian economist best known for her papers concerning various topics such as poverty, inequality, regional disparities and gender discrimination. She is currently working as a professor at Ashoka University, she has taught at Delhi School of Economics in the past as well. She has won many awards for her papers and publications, one of which is called Grammar of Caste: economic discrimination in contemporary India.

Education and work
Ashwini Deshpande completed her bachelors honouring in Economics in 1985 from the University of Delhi. She then proceeded to complete her masters at the Delhi School of Economics in 1987. Additionally, in 1994 she earned her Ph.D  at Delhi School of Economics with Some Aspects of the International Debt Crisis of Developing Countries. After graduating she was a lecturer at different colleges and universities in the Delhi area. From 1998-2000 Ashwini Deshpande Post-doctoral research fellow, University of North Carolina, Chapel Hill, USA.

She also has a lot of major research and organisational experience, which includes being a chairperson at the annual conference for development and change from 2005-2007 and 2010. In 2007 she was one of four people appointed to be the principal investigators in a project on Urban Labour Market Inequality in India, which was initiated by Princeton University, USA and Indian Institute of Dalit Studies.
She was also an author in a DFID funded study "Gender-caste growth assessment" designed to bring out the interconnections between growth and gender/caste inequalities in India. Additionally she was a regional author for the 2010 UN Report written by Naila Kabeer about inequality and if the MDG would be able to diminish the inequalities which many face. She was also appointed for some official positions including being a member in the ministry of minority affairs in 2007, the consultative group of external sector in 2004, and in planning commission  all for the Government of India. She has also done some work internationally, she was the deputy director of the Cambridge Advanced Program on Development Economics in 2002. She also served as a Social Sciences Jury Member for the Infosys Prize 2020.

Notable works
Ashwini Deshpande has written several works, including books, journal articles, and papers. The overall theme of her work is the effects of Indian culture on its own society. She has also written some articles about music.

Books
Ashwini Deshpande currently has published several books of her own, including The Grammar of Caste: Economic Discrimination in Contemporary India, published in 2011, Globalization and Development: A Handbook of New Perspectives, published in 2010, and The Global Economic Crisis and the Developing World.

The Grammar of Caste: Economic Discrimination in Contemporary India is about the discrimination there is within Indian society because of the caste system in India and how it has changed in recent years. Data from the Indian Railways for 23 years was examined. Research from various other writers suggests that there is patterns in the labour market which show that in many jobs people are discriminated against just because of their caste.

Globalization and Development: A Handbook of New Perspectives is a book written about the alternatives of globalization. Taking specific countries as case studies, the book explores alternative policies which could be implemented other than the mainstream discourse. In the book, decomposition method was used to measure the discrimination people face because of the caste system, and she discusses the advantages and disadvantages of using this methodology as well.

The Global Economic Crisis and the Developing World is a book about how wealth inequality can be effected by an economic crisis. In addition, it analyzes how unemployment is affected in a country due to a financial crisis by comparing separate countries unemployment and inequality levels. In the book, the main countries which are discussed are South Africa and Brazil. There was a correlation between inequality and unemployment with a coefficient of 80% based on data from 2001, 2002, and 2007. But, South Africa was a bit of an outlier as the data from the middle-class did not have a correlation with unemployment compared to the other classes and Brazil. The results showed that for a country to face the least amount of loss during a crisis, policies to maximize employment should be implemented.

Journals
Ashwini Deshpande has written, co-written, and edited hundreds of papers, below are some specifically concerning the effects of the caste system in India.

"Local Social Inequality, Economic Inequality, and Disparities in Child Height in India" (2019)
In this study, child height is analyzed as a marker of population health levels. The study took these height differences and compared them to the socioeconomic status of each child, as it would be assumed that a child with higher socioeconomic status would have a higher chance of being healthier and therefore taller. In the study they also looked at the relationship between the caste system in the particular area and how it affected the children's heights. The conclusion of the study was not clear as there seemed to be no direct trend which also associated with the caste system. Also the results contrasted with results from similar studies, who could actually find a correlation between the two variables.

"Who Is the Identifiable Victim? Caste and Charitable Giving in Modern India" (2016)
India has a very high wealth gap, and there are millions of charities worldwide asking for donations for poor kids in India. This study examines the markets in term of behaviour as people donate more and more 
. The study identifies an "identifiable victim effect" which can be seen in specific individuals. Data was collected for three different experiments. The first experiment consisted of a survey to receive detailed information about the person, so variables such as caste, age, and gender can be factored into the results. The second experiment ran around 56,000 advertisements of charities which were shown online in India to see if there were any common trends in the marketing of the charities. Thirdly the participants from the first survey would need to allocate real money to their preferred charity, this would show how each advertisement has an effect of the consumer and how it impacts their decision and how much they donate. The results of this paper concluded that the victim effect for high-caste individuals was more identifiable than the other participants. In lower-caste individuals this effect was minimal or even reversed, this would mean that when a person from a low-caste sees advertisements about people in need they are less likely to donate compared to high-caste individuals. The results of the study show how the caste-system still has an impact of an individual's choice in India.

"Disadvantage and discrimination in self-employment: caste gaps in earnings in Indian small businesses" (2016)
This study looks at data from the 2004–2005 India Human Development Survey, and compares the earnings from a business to an individuals's caste. One uncertainty from this study is that some aspects of earning may be unexplained, if one company earns more than the other it may not be case the answer is because their caste is different, it may just be that their product is poor. In the results around 55% of the gap was unexplained, which may render the results to not be as factual. But from the data comparison it was concluded that business owners that are from a lower or middle-case face greater discrimination in their earnings compared to higher-caste owners.

"Overlapping Identities under Liberalization: Gender and Caste in India" (2007)
This study specifically looks at the gender-caste overlap by compating data from the National Family and Health Survey and the Gender-Caste Development Index
. There was no conclusion for this particular study as the data was not able to be compared due to differences in years in which the data was presented. But, the author did make a comment that there could be possible links between early liberalization and intergroup disparity based on evidence. The research for this study was to quantify the aspects of the gender-caste overlap in India, but collecting data which could come up with clear results proved to be difficult. In an earlier paper Deshpande wrote in 2002 she has mentioned that the subgroup which is the worst off in India by about having double the burder is the group of low-caste women.

Double jeopardy? Caste, affirmative action, and stigma
This study looks at what the consequences are in university because of the caste system. A survey was given to university students, where they were asking questions regarding the admission process regarding non-reserved or open seats, which are seen as beneficiary programs that the university implements to give a fair chance to everyone applying, especially because in India there is sometimes corruption involved for admissions. In the results it was clear that students from a higher-caste did not take the beneficiary programs as well as the lower-caste students. Meaning higher-caste students were more judging and were looking at the programs prejudicially, which stems from the caste-system in India. The results point out that anti-discriminatory rules and policies should be put in action by educational institutions in India to decrease the amount of stigma revolving around low-caste individuals.

Awards and grants

References

External links
 List of works at Research Papers in Economics

20th-century Indian economists
21st-century Indian economists
Delhi School of Economics alumni
Indian economists
Place of birth missing (living people)
Delhi University alumni
Year of birth missing (living people)
Living people